Jackie Young may refer to:

Jackie Young (politician) (1934–2019), American politician
Jackie Young (basketball) (born 1997), American basketball player

See also
 Jack Young (disambiguation)